The Cross de l'Acier was an annual cross country running competition held in late November in Leffrinckoucke, France. First held in 1990, it was one of the foremost competitions of its type in France. Ten races were held at the event for athletes of varying abilities. Around 2200 runners took part in the day's event in 2010. Due to the COVID-19 pandemic and disagreements with the National Athletics League, it was announced that the race would be discontinued in 2022 after two years absence.  

The course of the competition was held around the Fort des Dunes – part of a set of military fortifications used in the First World War known as the Séré de Rivières system. The men's international elite race covered 9.95 km while the women's race took place over 6.55 km. These races were often used by French athletes to gain selection for the national team at the European Cross Country Championships, which is held a month after the event. The elite competition held permit status from European Athletics.

Over its history, the cross attracted elite runners of the highest calibre and former winners include multiple world record breaker Haile Gebrselassie, World Cross Country champions Zola Budd and Joseph Ebuya, and track world champions Fernanda Ribeiro and Linet Masai. Although many of the competition's most successful runners hail from East Africa, the race also features prominent European runners: Paulo Guerra and Mo Farah both won the European Championships after winning in Leffrinckoucke a month previously.

Past senior race winners

References

List of winners
Palmares. Cross de l'Acier. Retrieved on 2010-12-03.

External links
Official website

Cross country running competitions
Athletics competitions in France
Recurring sporting events established in 1990
Tourist attractions in Nord (French department)
Sport in Nord (French department)
1990 establishments in France
Cross country running in France